Elizabeth Palmer Peabody (May 16, 1804January 3, 1894) was an American educator who opened the first English-language kindergarten in the United States. Long before most educators, Peabody embraced the premise that children's play has intrinsic developmental and educational value.

Peabody was also the first known translator into English of the Buddhist scripture the Lotus Sutra, translating a chapter from its French translation in 1844.

Early years

Peabody was born in Billerica, Massachusetts on May 16, 1804. She was the daughter of Nathaniel Peabody, a physician, and Elizabeth ("Eliza") Palmer (1778–1853), and spent her early years in Salem.

Career

After 1822, she resided principally in Boston where she engaged in teaching.  She also became a writer and a prominent figure in the Transcendental movement. During 1834–1835, she worked as assistant teacher to Amos Bronson Alcott at his experimental Temple School in Boston. After the school closed, Peabody published Record of a School, outlining the plan of the school and Alcott's philosophy of early childhood education, which had drawn on German models.

Bookstore
She later opened a book store, Elizabeth Palmer Peabody's West Street Bookstore, at her home in Boston (c. 1840–1852).

It was there that the "Conversations" were held, organized by Margaret Fuller. The first of these meetings between women was held on November 6, 1839. Topics for these discussions and debates varied but subjects were as diverse as fine arts, history, mythology, literature, and nature. Fuller served as the "nucleus of conversation" and hoped to answer the "great questions" facing women: "What were we born to do? How shall we do it? which so few ever propose to themselves 'till their best years are gone by". Many figures in the woman's rights movement took part, including Sophia Dana Ripley, Caroline Sturgis, and Maria White Lowell.

The 1840 Catalogue of the Foreign Library offered several hundred titles in German, French, Spanish, Italian and English languages, including:

 Mrs. John Adams' Letters
 Andryane's Memoires d'un Prisonnier de'Etate au Spielberg
 Bentley's Miscellany
 Bonnycastle's Spanish America
 Boston Quarterly Review
 Buche's Ruins of Cities
 Channing's Slavery
 Crocker's Fairy Legends
 Dumeril's Elemens des sciences Naturelles
 Mrs. Farrar's Howard's Life
 Fraser's Magazine
 Guarini's Pastor Fido
 Haydn et Mozart lettres
 Herder's Hebrew Poetry
 Junger's Lustspiele
 Lanzi's Storia Pittorica
 Lessing's Nathan der Weise
 Metropolitan Magazine
 Miss Mitford's Our Village
 Musical Journal
 Isaac Taylor's Natural History of Enthusiasm
 Sara Coleridge's Phantasmion
 Pringle's Residence in South Africa
 Revue des deux Mondes
 George Sand's André
 Madame Necker de Saussure's Notice sur le caractère et les écrits de Mme de Staël
 Cockton's Valentine Vox, illus. by Cruikshank
 Vie de Poussin

In 1852, the bookstore and library located at 13–15 West Street in Boston closed down. Members of the Transcendentalist movement had begun to disperse since the mid-1840s and income from the bookstore had gradually declined. In 2011, the Boston Landmarks Commission designated the building as a Boston Landmark.

The Dial

For a time, Peabody was the business manager of The Dial, the main publication of the Transcendentalists. In 1843, she noted that the journal's income was not covering the cost of printing and that subscriptions totaled just over two hundred. In 1844 the magazine published Peabody's translation of a portion of the Lotus Sutra from French, which was the first English version of a Buddhist scripture. The publication ceased shortly thereafter in April 1844.

Kindergarten
When Peabody opened her kindergarten in 1860, the practice of providing formal schooling for children younger than six was largely confined to Germany. She had a particular interest in the educational methods of Friedrich Fröbel, particularly after meeting one of his students, Margarethe Schurz, in 1859.  In 1867, she visited Germany for the purpose of studying Fröbel's teachings more closely. Through her own kindergarten, and as editor of the Kindergarten Messenger (1873–1877), Peabody helped establish kindergarten as an accepted institution in American education. She also wrote numerous books in support of the cause. The extent of her influence is apparent in a statement submitted to Congress on February 12, 1897, in support of free kindergartens:

"The advantage to the community in utilizing the age from 4 to 6 in training the hand and eye; in developing the habits of cleanliness, politeness, self-control, urbanity, industry; in training the mind to understand numbers and geometric forms, to invent combinations of figures and shapes, and to represent them with the pencil—these and other valuable lessons… will, I think, ultimately prevail in securing to us the establishment of this beneficent institution in all the city school systems of our country."

Diverse activities
With grounding in history and literature and a reading knowledge of ten languages, in 1840 she also opened a bookstore which held Margaret Fuller's "Conversations" and published books from Nathaniel Hawthorne and others in addition to the periodicals The Dial and Æsthetic Papers.  She was an advocate of antislavery and of Transcendentalism. Moreover, she also led decades of efforts for the rights of the Paiute Indians.

Personal life

Her sisters were painter Sophia Peabody Hawthorne  (wife of writer Nathaniel Hawthorne) and writer Mary Tyler Peabody Mann (wife of educator Horace Mann). Peabody died January 3, 1894, aged 89. She is buried at Sleepy Hollow Cemetery in Concord, Massachusetts.

Selected works
Peabody published a number of works, including:
 Record of a school: exemplifying the general principles of spiritual culture. (Boston: J. Munroe, 1835). About Bronson Alcott's Temple School, Boston.
 Crimes of the House of Austria (editor; New York, 1852)
 The Polish-American System of Chronology (Boston, 1852)
 Kindergarten Culture (1870)
 Kindergarten in Italy (1872)
 Reminiscences of Rev. Wm Ellery Channing, D.D. (1880)
 Letters to Kindergarteners (1886)
 Last Evening with Allston, and other Papers (1887)
 Lectures in the Training Schools for Kindergartners (1888)

See also
 Susan Blow
 Maria Kraus-Boelté
 Elizabeth Pabodie
 Boston Women's Heritage Trail

References

External links

 
 
 
Peabody, Elizabeth, Ed. Æsethic Papers. The Editor, Boston, 1849, at the Internet Archive.
Elizabeth Peabody and Her Aesthetic Papers excerpted from The Periodicals Of American Transcendentalism by Clarence L. F. Gohdes (Duke University Press, 1931) pp. 142–156, courtesy of the Walden Woods Project.
 Mabel Flick Altstetter, “Some Prophets of the American Kindergarten,” Peabody Journal of Education, Vol. 13, No. 5 (March 1936), pp. 221–225.
Salem Women's Heritage Trail
Boston Women's Heritage Trail
City of Boston, Boston Landmarks Commission13-15 West Street Study Report

Members of the Transcendental Club
American educators
American education writers
Early childhood education in the United States
Writers from Boston
1804 births
1894 deaths
19th century in Boston
People from Billerica, Massachusetts
Bookstores in Boston
Commercial circulating libraries
American abolitionists
19th-century American women writers
19th-century American writers
American women non-fiction writers